This is the list of cathedrals in China sorted by original denomination.

Roman Catholic
Cathedrals of the Catholic Church in China:

  in Baoding
 Immaculate Conception Cathedral (South Church) in Beijing
 Xishiku Cathedral (North Church) in Beijing
 Wangfujing Cathedral (St. Joseph's or East Church) in Beijing
 Cathedral of Bengbu in Bengbu
  in Changsha
 Immaculate Conception Cathedral in Chengdu
  in Chifeng
 Xiwanzi Cathedral in Chongli
 St. Joseph's Cathedral in Chongqing
 Mother of Grace Cathedral in Daming
 Cathedral of the Immaculate Heart of Mary in Datong
  of Fenyang
 Cathedral of St. Dominic in Fuzhou
 Sacred Heart Cathedral (Seksat Church) in Guangzhou
  in Guiyang
 Cathedral of the Immaculate Conception in Hangzhou
  in Hanyang
 Cathedral of St. Michael the Archangel in Hanzhong
 Sacred Heart of Jesus Cathedral in Harbin
  in Hohhot
 Sacred Heart of Jesus Cathedral in Jilin City
 Sacred Heart Cathedral in Jinan
 Xidianzi Cathedral of the Sacred Hearts of Jesus and Mary in Jingzhou
 Cathedral of Jinzhong
 Cathedral of Our Lady of the Rosary in Ulanqab
  in Kaifeng
  in Kunming
 Sacred Heart of Jesus Cathedral in Leshan
 Cathedral of the Sacred Heart in Longbao
 Cathedral of the Mother of God in Luoyang
 Cathedral of the Holy Family in Meizhou
  in Nanchang
 Immaculate Conception Cathedral in Nanjing
 Cathedral of Our Lady of China in Nanning
 Cathedral of the Good Shepherd in Nantong
 Cathedral of Our Lady of the Seven Sorrows in Ningbo
  in Ningbo
 Cathedral of Pingliang
 St. Michael's Cathedral in Qingdao
 St. Michael's Cathedral in Qiqihar
  in Sanyuan
 St. Ignatius Cathedral (Xujiahui Church) in Shanghai
 Cathedral of the Sacred Heart of Jesus (South Church) in Shangqiu
  in Shantou
 Sacred Heart of Jesus Cathedral in Shenyang
 Immaculate Heart of Mary Cathedral in Shiqi
  Cathedral of Our Lady of Seven Sorrows in Suzhou
 Cathedral of the Immaculate Conception in Taiyuan
 Jiaojiang Sacred Heart Cathedral in Taizhou
 Immaculate Conception Cathedral in Tangshan
 Dongguan Cathedral in Tianshui
 St. Joseph Cathedral (Laoxikai Church) in Tianjin
 Cathedral of St. Paul in Wenzhou
  in Wuhan
 St. Joseph Cathedral in Wuhu
 Cathedral of Christ the King in Wuqiu Village
 St. Francis Cathedral in Xi’an
 Cathedral of Christ the King in Xiamen
  in Xianxian
 Cathedral of the Angels in Xichang
 Cathedral of Weinan
 Holy Cross Cathedral in Zhangjiakou
 Sacred Heart Cathedral in Xuzhou
 Slope in the Catholic Church in Yanggu County
 Cathedral of the Holy Spirit in Yanzhou
 Cathedral of St. Francis in Yichang
 Cathedral of the Immaculate Heart of Mary in Yinchuan
 Immaculate Conception Cathedral in Shijiazhuang
 Cathedral of St. Victor in Zhanjiang
 Zhoucun Cathedral in Zhoucun
 Cathedral of the Immaculate Heart of Mary (Sanmenshizi Cathedral) in Zhouzhi
See also:

 : Category:Roman Catholic cathedrals in Macau

Eastern Orthodox
(Former) Eastern Orthodox cathedrals in China:
 Saint Sophia Cathedral in Harbin
See also:

Anglican
(Former) Anglican cathedrals in China:
 Holy Saviour's Cathedral in Beijing
 Holy Trinity Cathedral in Shanghai
 St John's Cathedral in Langzhong
See also:

See also
List of cathedrals
Christianity in China

References

External links

 Catholic Church in China by Catholic-Hierarchy

 
China
Lists of religious buildings and structures in China
Cathedrals